The 2017 Boels Rental Ladies Tour also known as the 2017 Holland Ladies Tour is the 20th edition of the Holland Ladies Tour, a women's cycle stage race held in the Netherlands. The tour is part of the 2017 women's road cycling calendar and is part of the UCI Women's World Tour.

Stages

Prologue
29 August 2017 — Wageningen to Wageningen, individual time trial (ITT)

Stage 2
30 August 2017 — Eibergen to Arnhem,

Stage 3
31 August 2017 — Roosendaal to Roosendaal,

Stage 4
1 September 2017 — Gennep to Weert,

Classification leadership

See also

 2017 in women's road cycling

References

External links
 

Boels Rental Ladies Tour
Boels Rental Ladies Tour
Holland Ladies Tour
Cycling in Gelderland
Cycling in Limburg (Netherlands)
Cycling in Arnhem
Cycling in Gennep
Cycling in Roosendaal
Cycling in Sittard-Geleen
Cycling in Weert
Sport in Berkelland
Sport in Vaals
Sport in Wageningen